Bianka Nagy (born 28 June 2000) is a Hungarian sprint canoeist.

She competed at the 2021 ICF Canoe Sprint World Championships, winning a bronze medal in the C-2 200 m distance.

References

External links

2000 births
Living people
Hungarian female canoeists
ICF Canoe Sprint World Championships medalists in Canadian
21st-century Hungarian women
European Games competitors for Hungary
Canoeists at the 2019 European Games